David Herman (born February 20, 1967) is an American actor and comedian. He was an original cast member on MADtv from 1995 to 1997, and played Michael Bolton in Office Space. 

He has done voice-over work in hundreds of episodes of Bob's Burgers, Brickleberry, Futurama, King of the Hill, OK K.O.! Let's Be Heroes, Disenchantment, and Father of the Pride.

Early life

Herman was born into a Jewish family in New York City and raised in Washington Heights, Manhattan. He graduated from the Fiorello H. LaGuardia High School of Music & Art and Performing Arts in 1987, then attended the acting program at SUNY Purchase.

Career

MADtv 
Herman was part of the cast of John Leguizamo's short-lived series House of Buggin' in 1994. When Fox cancelled House of Buggin''' and decided to replace it with a sketch comedy show, Herman was signed on as one of nine original cast members of MADtv when the series began in 1995. 

Unlike most of the other featured players, Herman came to the show with an established acting career (as did fellow cast member Phil LaMarr); he had appeared in the films Born on the Fourth of July, Lost Angels, and Let It Be Me. Herman's MADtv characters included Mike Lawson (Incredible Findings), Generation X anchorman Marsh (X News), and concerned father Joel Linder.

Herman lampooned celebrities and famous figures such as Don Adams (as Maxwell Smart from Get Smart), Tim Allen (as Tim "the Tool Man" Taylor from Home Improvement), Woody Allen, Nicolas Cage, Bill Clinton, Bob Dole, David Duchovny (as Fox Mulder from The X-Files), Larry Flynt, Tom Hanks (as Forrest Gump and as Jim Lovell from Apollo 13), Larry King, Kenny Kingston, Regis Philbin, Charles Nelson Reilly, John Ritter (as himself and as Jack Tripper from Three's Company), Joel Schumacher, Robert Shapiro, Pauly Shore, Brent Spiner, Patrick Stewart (as Jean-Luc Picard from Star Trek: The Next Generation), and Alex Trebek.

Herman stayed with the show until exiting six episodes into the third season. He said in 2019 that he wanted to leave the show to do other projects, but Fox would not let him out of his contract, as they considered him too valuable to the show, so Herman got himself fired by screaming all his lines during read-through. While continuing his voice work on King of the Hill, he came across the script for Office Space, for which Hill creator Mike Judge had specifically written the Michael Bolton part with Herman in mind.

 Other television projects 
Herman's television credits include guest-starring on the WB's Angel and Fox's action drama 24. 

 Film projects 
Although he is primarily a television actor, Herman has appeared in several films including Dude, Where's My Car? and Fun with Dick and Jane. Herman had a prominent role in the 1999 comedy Office Space, where he played a gangsta rap-loving nerd unfortunately named Michael Bolton who must endure questions about his relationship to the famous singer. In 2006, he appeared in another Mike Judge film, Idiocracy. 

 Voice acting 
Herman is also known for his work as a voice actor in cartoons and video games, notably in Futurama, where he provides the voices of many recurring characters (including Scruffy, Planet Express's Sling Blade-esque janitor; Roberto, the mentally-deranged criminal robot obsessed with stabbing people; New New York City mayor, Mayor Poopenmeyer, and Professor Farnsworth's former student and current rival, Ogden Wernstrom), and King of the Hill, for which he voiced Luanne's ill-fated boyfriend, Buckley, as well as several one-shot and incidental characters. Herman's other voice work includes parts on Family Guy, American Dad!, the short-lived CGI-animated sitcom Father of the Pride (in which he voices Roy Horn), and the Jak and Daxter video game series. Herman also starred as Ubuntu Goode (and other supporting voices) on Mike Judge's short-lived companion series to King of the Hill, The Goode Family. He also provides the voice for Mr. Frond (and other supporting voices) in Fox's Bob's Burgers, Mr. Gar, Brandon, and others on Cartoon Network's OK K.O.! Let's Be Heroes, The Herald and various characters on Matt Groening's Netflix series Disenchantment, self-absorbed and dangerously incompetent park ranger Steve Williams on Comedy Central's Brickleberry, and Kevin Crawford on Paradise PD''.

Filmography

Film

Television

Video games

Other

References

External links 
 

American male film actors
American male voice actors
American male television actors
American male video game actors
Audiobook narrators
People from Washington Heights, Manhattan
1967 births
Jewish American male comedians
Jewish American male actors
Living people
Male actors from New York City
State University of New York at Purchase alumni
American sketch comedians
Comedians from New York City
21st-century American comedians
21st-century American Jews